Union County State Fish and Wildlife Area is an Illinois state park on  in Union County, Illinois, United States.  It contains extensive Clear Creek wetlands managed for fishing and bird hunting.

References

State parks of Illinois
Protected areas of Union County, Illinois
1940s establishments in Illinois
Protected areas established in the 1940s